{{DISPLAYTITLE:C19H19NO4}}
The molecular formula C19H19NO4 (molar mass: 325.35 g/mol, exact mass: 325.131408 u) may refer to:

 Amurensine, an alkaloid found in some Papaver species
 Bulbocapnine, an alkaloid
 Cheilanthifoline, an alkaloid found in Corydalis dubia
 Domesticine
 Ro67-4853